LIUNA Station is a banquet and convention centre in central Hamilton, Ontario.

History 
LIUNA Station, former CN Railway James Street Station, on the east side of James Street North at Murray Street, was built between 1929 and 1931 by the Canadian National Railway to a design by architect John Schofield.

The property is one of the National Historic Sites of Canada and has been designated under the Federal Heritage Railway Stations Protection Act and under Part IV of the Ontario Heritage Act by City of Hamilton By-law 95-115. Portions of the building were protected by the Ontario Heritage Trust in 1999.

In 1967, GO Transit took over CN's commuter service between Toronto and Hamilton, and in 1978 all other CN passenger service was transferred to Via Rail.

In 1992, Via Rail closed their Burlington, Hamilton and Dundas stations and consolidated service at the new Aldershot GO Station.

GO Transit closed the James Street station in 1993 and moved any remaining service to the Hamilton GO Centre, only one and a half kilometres directly south on James Street.

The Laborers' International Union of North America (LIUNA) bought and renovated the station, and in 2000, station was reopened as LIUNA Station, an events centre with catering facilities for weddings, dances, and other special events.

See also
The adjoining West Harbour GO Station opened in 2015.

References

External links

Liuna Station homepage

Buildings and structures in Hamilton, Ontario
Canadian National Railway stations in Ontario
Railway stations in Canada opened in 1931
Railway stations closed in 1993
Designated heritage railway stations in Ontario
National Historic Sites in Ontario
Designated heritage properties in Ontario
Disused railway stations in Canada
Former Via Rail stations in Ontario
Former Amtrak stations in Canada
Railway stations in Hamilton, Ontario
Station
Trade union buildings in Canada